Nataliya Senkina (born 23 September 1970) is a Uzbekistani sprinter. She competed in the women's 4 × 400 metres relay at the 2000 Summer Olympics.

References

1970 births
Living people
Athletes (track and field) at the 2000 Summer Olympics
Uzbekistani female sprinters
Olympic athletes of Uzbekistan
Place of birth missing (living people)
Olympic female sprinters
21st-century Uzbekistani women